Contextual empiricism is a theory about validating scientific knowledge. It is the view that scientific knowledge is shaped by contextual values as well as constitutive ones.

See also 
Scientific theory
Helen Longino

References 

Empiricism
Metatheory of science